Otto Thott (13 October 1703 – 10 September 1785) was a Danish Count, minister of state, and land owner. During his lifetime, he acquired Gavnø Castle and one of the largest private collections of   book and manuscripts  in Denmark.

Early life and education
He was the son of Tage Thott (1648-1707), a member of the Danish Privy Council and county governor of Holbæk. After the death of his father, his mother, Petra Sophie Reedtz (1675-1720) sold the manor at Turebyholm and moved with him to Sorø, where he attended school. After the death of his mother, he was supported financially by several aunts and was able to continue his education and development abroad.

He lived for a time in Halle, where he studied  history,  philosophy and Jurisprudence at the University of Halle-Wittenberg. He continued these studies in the University of Jena and later during his stays in the Netherlands, England and France. Additionally, he made the acquaintance of several scientists in the various towns where he stayed and  managed to acquire a number of valuable manuscripts and books.

Career 
In 1723, upon his return to Denmark, he obtained a secretary position in the Danish Chancellery.   On 30 August 1746 he came to lead the College of Finance as the 1st deputy, a post he held until 6 December 1759. He led during a time in which he succeeded in paying down the government debt. In 1758 he  join the State Council (gehejmekonseillet). In February 1763, he succeeded Johan Ludvig Holstein as Minister of Finance and secretary of the Danish Chancellor. 

Shortly after King Frederick V's accession to the throne, he had received the Order of the Dannebrog and in 1747 was made a member of the Danish Privy Council. In 1752, Dowager Queen Sophie Magdalene (1700–1770) awarded him the Ordre de l'Union Parfaite.

Book collector 
In 1737, Otto Thott bought  St. Agnes' Priory on the island of Gavnø. From 1755-1758, he modernized the estate turning it into the rococo palace later known as Gavnø Castle. 

Otto Thott acquired most of the library of Edward Harley (1689–1741) after the latter's death.  The library of Otto Thott contained 138,000 volumes at his death in 1785. It was one of the largest private libraries of the 18th century in Denmark.

The Royal Danish Library in Copenhagen received 4,154 manuscripts and 6,159 early printed books, of which 1,500 were incunabula. Further, the library bought about 60,000 volumes at the auction sale.

Personal life
In 1732, he married Birgitte Charlotte Kruse (1711-1781) a daughter of Major General Ulrik Christian Kruse (1666-1727). Otto Thott died during 1785. Both he and his wife were buried at Sorø Klosterkirke.

See also 
 Daniel Gotthilf Moldenhawer
 Thott Palace
 Gavnø

References

Further reading 
 E. Holm Thott, Otto i 1. at the Dansk biografisk leksikon, pp. 336–342.
 Catalogues of Otto Thott collection of books available at Google Books.
 Collectors' bindings
 
  Bibliotheca Thottiana: INDEX CODICUM MANUSCRIPTORUM  • Introduction

External links
Gavnø Castle website

1703 births
1785 deaths
People from Næstved Municipality
People from Sorø Municipality
University of Halle alumni
University of Jena alumni
18th-century Danish nobility
Danish counts
18th-century Danish landowners
18th-century Danish politicians
Danish book and manuscript collectors
Ordre de l'Union Parfaite
Noble Knights of the Order of the Dannebrog
Thott family